Richard Adrian Jacques (born 1973) is a British composer of film, television and video game music. Best known for his critically acclaimed orchestral scores for blockbuster franchises such as James Bond 007: Blood Stone, Sonic R, Mass Effect, LittleBigPlanet 2, Alice In Wonderland, Starship Troopers and Headhunter, Jacques has collaborated with numerous premier TV and movie theatre campaigns for some of the world's largest media agencies including Saatchi & Saatchi and McCann Ericsson, and global brands such as Audi, Bacardi, Mercedes-Benz and Stella Artois. His music for television includes top brand shows for the BBC, ITV and Channel 4.

Early life
Jacques was interested in composing music from an early age. He was awarded a scholarship to attend the Royal Academy of Music in London, studying trombone and piano, and showed a keen interest in composition in multiple styles including orchestral, jazz and popular music genres. He then attended Wells Cathedral School aged 16 as a Specialist Musician, where he also took up Percussion. In 1994 Jacques graduated with a Batchelor of Arts degree in music from Colchester Institute / University of Essex. He was immediately hired as an in-house composer at Sega Europe.

Career
At Sega Europe, Jacques began by composing soundtracks for a number of Sega Saturn and Dreamcast games such as Daytona CCE, Sonic R, Sonic 3D, Jet Set Radio, Metropolis Street Racer and Jet Set Radio Future.

Jacques's perhaps best known and acclaimed work at SEGA came with 2001's Headhunter  was the first video game soundtrack to be recorded with A-list musicians at Abbey Road Studios' Studio One. The soundtrack was well received, and won multiple awards including Game Audio Network Guild 'Recognition Award', and was performed at the first Symphonic Game Music Concert at The Gewandhaus in Leipzig and Video Games Live events including the inaugural concert at the Hollywood Bowl in 2005. Jacques left Sega Europe shortly after Headhunter'''s release and became a freelance composer, continuing his relationship with SEGA by scoring Headhunter: Redemption in 2004.

Jacques went on to compose the BAFTA and Ivor Novello nominated original music for James Bond 007: Blood Stone, which is a big energy score that immerses the audience in a thrilling, cinematic Bond experience. The score received top honours for "Best Original Composition" from the Music and Sound Awards 2012. After this, Jacques composed the music for the Alice In Wonderland game, for Disney in 2010, and LittleBigPlanet 2 for Sony in 2011.

Soon after, Richard opened a new studio in central London AUDISSI where which he writes original music for new advertising, television. video games and other visual media projects, including an animated feature film. This included music for TV game-shows such as Don't Scare the Hare, Prize Island, Fifteen to One, Catchphrase, The Getaway Car, Go for It, Don't Ask Me Ask Britain and Y Siambr''.

In 2018, Jacques was presented with the Lifetime Achievement award from the Game Audio Network Guild.

Works

Video games

Film and TV

References

External links
Richard Jacques's official site

1973 births
Living people
English composers
People from Warwickshire
Video game composers
Freelance musicians
British people of French descent
La-La Land Records artists